The Mirchi Music Award for Music Composer of The Year is given yearly by Radio Mirchi as a part of its annual Mirchi Music Awards for Hindi films, to recognise a music director who has delivered an outstanding performance in a film song.

Superlatives

List of winners
 2008 A.R Rahman - "Kabhi Kabhi Aditi" from Jaane Tu... Ya Jaane Na
 Vishal–Shekhar - "Jaane Kyun" from Dostana
 A.R Rahman - "Kaise Mujhe" from Ghajini
 Pritam - "Teri Ore" from Singh Is Kinng
 Shankar–Ehsaan–Loy - "Ye Tumhari Meri Baatein" from Rock On!!
 2009 A.R Rahman - "Masakali" from Delhi-6
 Shankar–Ehsaan–Loy - "Sapnon Se Bhare Naina" from Luck By Chance
 A.R Rahman - "Rehna Tu" from Delhi-6
 Pritam - "Tera Hone Laga Hoon" from Ajab Prem Ki Ghazab Kahani
 A.R Rahman - "Jai Ho" from Slumdog Millionaire
 2010 Sajid–Wajid - "Tere Mast Mast Do Nain" from Dabangg
 Shankar–Ehsaan–Loy - "Sajdaa" from My Name is Khan
 Lalit Pandit - "Munni Badnaam Hui" from Dabangg
 Pritam - "Pee Loon" from Once Upon A Time In Mumbaai
 Vishal Bhardwaj - "Dil To Bachcha Hai" from Ishqiya
 2011 A.R Rahman - "Nadaan Parindey" from Rockstar
 Vishal–Shekhar - "Ooh La La" from The Dirty Picture
 A.R Rahman - "Sadda Haq" from Rockstar
 Shankar–Ehsaan–Loy - "Senorita" from Zindagi Na Milegi Dobara
 Himesh Reshammiya - "Teri Meri" from Bodyguard
 2012 Ajay–Atul - "Abhi Mujh Mein Kahin" from Agneepath
 Ajay–Atul - "Chikni Chameli" from Agneepath
 Pritam - "Ala Barfi" from Barfi!
 Pritam - "Phir Le Aya Dil" from Barfi!
 Pritam - "Tum Hi Ho Bandhu" from Cocktail
 2013 Mithoon - "Tum Hi Ho" from Aashiqui 2
 Pritam - "Badtameez Dil" from Yeh Jawaani Hai Deewani
 Shankar–Ehsaan–Loy - "Zinda" from Bhaag Milkha Bhaag
 Shankar–Ehsaan–Loy - "O Rangrez" from Bhaag Milkha Bhaag
 Ankit Tiwari - "Sunn Raha Hai" from Aashiqui 2
 2014 Shankar–Ehsaan–Loy - "Mast Magan" from 2 States
 Vishal–Shekhar - "Manwa Laage" from Happy New Year
 Vishal Bhardwaj - "Bismil" from Haider
 Ankit Tiwari - "Galliyan" from Ek Villain
 Jeet Gannguli - "Muskurane" from CityLights
 2015 Pritam - "Gerua" from Dilwale
 Amaal Mallik - "Sooraj Dooba Hain" from Roy
 Sanjay Leela Bhansali - "Aayat" from Bajirao Mastani
 Sanjay Leela Bhansali - "Deewani Mastani" from Bajirao Mastani
 Sachin–Jigar - "Chunar" from ABCD 2
 2016 Pritam - "Ae Dil Hai Mushkil" from Ae Dil Hai Mushkil
 Pritam - "Channa Mereya" from Ae Dil Hai Mushkil
 Pritam - "Bulleya" from Ae Dil Hai Mushkil
 Vishal–Shekhar - "Jag Ghoomeya" from Sultan
 Amit Trivedi - "Ikk Kudi" from Udta Punjab
 2017 Pritam - "Hawayein" from Jab Harry Met Sejal
 Sachin–Jigar - "Manaa Ki Hum Yaar Nehi" from Meri Pyaari Bindu
 Sachin–Jigar - "Hoor" from Hindi Medium
 Mithoon - "Phir Bhi Tumko Chaahunga" from Half Girlfriend
 Tanishk Bagchi - "Baarish" from Half Girlfriend
 Amaal Mallik - "Aashiq Surrender Hua" from Badrinath Ki Dulhania
 2018 Sanjay Leela Bhansali - "Ek Dil Ek Jaan" from Padmaavat
 Sanjay Leela Bhansali - "Khalibali" from Padmaavat
 Ajay–Atul - "Dhadak" from Dhadak
 Sanjay Leela Bhansali - "Binte Dil" from Padmaavat
 Amit Trivedi - "Aaj Se Teri" from Pad Man
 2019  Pritam - "Kalank" from Kalank
 Sachet–Parampara - "Bekhayali" from Kabir Singh
 Mithoon - "Tujhe Kitna Chahne Lage" from Kabir Singh
 Pritam - "Ghar More Pardesiya" from Kalank
 Shashwat Sachdev - "Beh Chala" from Uri: The Surgical Strike

See also
 Mirchi Music Awards
 Bollywood
 Cinema of India

References

Mirchi Music Awards